Felix Draeseke's Quintet for Piano, Strings and Horn in B-flat major, Op. 48, was composed in 1888 and published a year later by  of Leipzig. It was dedicated to Adolph Stern.

Scoring and structure
The work is scored for piano, violin, viola, cello and horn in F. It is structured in four movements:

 Allegro con brio, ma non troppo vivace
 Andante grave
 Scherzo: Presto leggiero
 Finale: Allegro con brio – Allegro vivace e leggiero''

It was performed 29 June 1889 in Wiesbaden if not necessarily premiered then.

Recordings

In 2017, Tyxart Records released a recording of the Quintet paired with the Sonata for Clarinet and Piano along with other chamber works for horn. There are at least two other recordings as of 2017, on Musikproduktion Dabringhaus und Grimm coupled with a work by Robert Schumann and another on Classic Produktion Osnabrück (also released in 2017).

References
Notes

Sources

External links

The Finale of the Quintet, performed by the Coburger Draeseke Ensemble in 2011

Compositions by Felix Draeseke
1888 compositions
Draeseke
Compositions in B-flat major